Gavanlu (also Romanized as Gavānlū; also known as Gavānleh, Govāneleh, and Govānleh) is a village in Seyyed Jamal ol Din Rural District, in the Central District of Asadabad County, Hamadan Province, Iran. At the 2006 census, its population was 68, in 15 families.

References 

Populated places in Asadabad County